The Journal des Économistes was a nineteenth-century French academic journal on political economy. It was founded in 1841 and published by Gilbert Guillaumin (1801 - 1864). Among its editors were Gustave de Molinari and Yves Guyot. It featured contributions of Léon Walras, Frédéric Bastiat, Charles Renouard and Vilfredo Pareto, among many other eminent economists. The publication of the journal was halted just after the start of the Second World War, in March/April 1940.

See also 
 French Liberal School

External links

Online archive of articles in Gallica, the digital library of the BnF.

1841 establishments in France
1940 disestablishments in France
Defunct magazines published in France
Business magazines published in France
French-language magazines
French Liberal School
Magazines established in 1841
Magazines disestablished in 1940